Hermann Yaméogo (born August 27, 1948) is a Burkinabé politician and leader of the National Union for Democracy and Development (UNDD).

Although he decided to boycott the 13 November 2005 presidential elections a month prior to the poll, his name remained on the ballot. He was placed 11th out of 13 candidates, receiving 0.76% of the vote.

He was born in Koudougou, the son of Maurice Yaméogo, who was the country's first president.

References

1948 births
Living people
People from Centre-Ouest Region
National Union for the Defence of Democracy politicians
21st-century Burkinabé people